Gemara La'Juan Williams (born April 30, 1983) is a former professional football player who saw action in the NFL and CFL. He was signed by the New England Patriots in 2006 and was later placed on season-ending injury reserve. He saw minimal action in 2007 and 2008 on special teams and defense. Williams known as a speedster for his 4.2 speed, played college football at Buffalo.

Williams also played for the Montreal Alouettes and Edmonton Eskimos.

Professional career

New England Patriots
Williams was signed as an undrafted free agent out of the University at Buffalo after the 2006 NFL Draft by the Patriots but was released before training camp. Williams re-signed on August 12, 2006, only to be placed on season-ending injured reserve at the start of the 2006 season. In 2007 Williams was part of the Patriots 18-1 season contributing as a kick returner and nickel back.

Edmonton Eskimos
After suffering an ACL injury with the Montreal Alouettes, Williams was signed to the Edmonton Eskimos on September 1, 2009 to finish his remaining years with the Eskimos.

External links
Montreal Alouettes bio
New England Patriots bio

1983 births
Living people
American football cornerbacks
American football return specialists
American players of Canadian football
Buffalo Bulls football players
Canadian football defensive backs
Edmonton Elks players
Montreal Alouettes players
New England Patriots players
People from Oak Park, Michigan